
Year 870 (DCCCLXX) was a common year starting on Sunday (link will display the full calendar) of the Julian calendar.

Events 
 By place 
 Europe 
 August 8 – Treaty of Meerssen: King Louis the German forces his half-brother Charles the Bald to accept a peace treaty, which partitions the Middle Frankish Kingdom into two larger east and west divisions. Louis receives most of Austrasia (which evolves into the Kingdom of Germany), and Charles receives territory in Lower Burgundy (which evolves into the Kingdom of France). However, large parts of the Frisian coast are under Viking control.
 Charles the Bald marries Richilde of Provence, after the death of his first wife, Ermentrude of Orleans. He intends to secure his rule in Lotharingia through the powerful Bosonid family and the connection to Teutberga, widow-queen of Lothair II.
 Rastislav, ruler (knyaz) of Great Moravia, dies in prison after he is condemned to death for treason, by Louis the German. He is succeeded by his nephew Svatopluk I, who becomes a vassal of the East Frankish Kingdom.
 Bořivoj I, duke of Bohemia, makes Levý Hradec (modern Czech Republic) his residence. Around this time Prague Castle is founded (approximate date).
 Wilfred the Hairy, a Frankish nobleman, becomes count of Urgell and Cerdanya (modern-day Catalonia).

 Britain 
 Autumn – The Great Heathen Army, led by Ivar the Boneless  and Ubba, invades East Anglia and plunders Peterborough. King Edmund the Martyr is captured, tortured, beaten and used for archery practice (or 869).
 The Danes, led by Ivar the Boneless and King Olaf of the Dublin Vikings, besiege Dumbarton in Scotland, the capital of King Artgal of Stratchlyde. After a siege of four months, the citadel is captured and destroyed. 
 The Danes, led by Halfdan Ragnarsson and Bagsecg, invade Wessex and take the royal estate at Reading (Berkshire), which Halfdan makes his headquarters. A naval Viking contingent sails up the Thames River.
 December 31 – Battle of Englefield: The Vikings clash with ealdorman Æthelwulf of Berkshire. The invaders are driven back to Reading; many of the Danes (including one of the earls named Sidrac) are killed.

 Abbasid Caliphate 
 January 29 – Anarchy at Samarra: The rebel Salih ibn Wasif is hunted down and killed in Abbasid Samarra by troops of Musa ibn Bugha al-Kabir.
 June 21 – Caliph Al-Muhtadi is deposed and killed by the Turks, after a brief reign. He is succeeded by Al-Mu'tamid (son of the late Al-Mutawakkil) as ruler of the Abbasid Caliphate, who moves his court to Baghdad. End of the Anarchy at Samarra.
 Byzantine–Arab War: A Muslim expeditionary force, led by Halaf al-Hadim, Arab governor of Sicily, conquers Malta. He is welcomed by the local Christian inhabitants as liberator of the agonizing Byzantine yoke. The Muslim invaders loot and pillage the island, destroying the most important buildings.
 The Zanj Rebellion: The Zanj (black slaves from East Africa) capture the Abbasid seaport of Al-Ubdullah at the Persian Gulf, and cut off communications with Basra (modern Iraq).

 By topic 
 Religion 
 February 28 – The Fourth Council of Constantinople ends. The Bulgarians are granted an autonomous archbishopric. with its seat in the capital of Pliska.

Births 
 Æthelflæd, lady ruler of Mercia (d. 918)
 Alexander III, Byzantine emperor (d. 913)
 Bernard, illegitimate son of Charles the Fat (d. 891)
 Ebalus, duke of Aquitaine (approximate date)
 Ermengol, Frankish nobleman (d. 937)
 Fulk I, Frankish nobleman (approximate date)
 Lde-dpal-hkhor-btsan, Indian ruler (approximate date)
 Pavle, prince of Serbia (approximate date)
 Petar, prince of Serbia (approximate date)
 Romanos I, Byzantine emperor (d. 948)
 Sunifred II, count of Urgell (approximate date)
 Sunyer, count of Barcelona (approximate date)
 Theodora, Roman politician (approximate date)
 Wang Dingbao, Chinese chancellor (d. 941)
 Zhu Yanshou, Chinese governor (d. 903) 
 Zwentibold, king of Lotharingia (d. 900)

Deaths 
 January 29 – Salih ibn Wasif, Muslim general 
 February 4 – Ceolnoth, archbishop of Canterbury
 April 2 – Æbbe the Younger, Frankish abbess
 June 21 – Al-Muhtadi, Muslim caliph
 September 1 – Muhammad al-Bukhari, Persian scholar (b. 810)
 November 20 – Edmund the Martyr, king of East Anglia (or 869)
 December 4 – Suairlech ind Eidnén mac Ciaráin, Irish bishop  
 December 27 – Aeneas of Paris, Frankish bishop
 Adarnase II, Georgian Bagratid prince (approximate date)
 Al-Harith ibn Sima al-Sharabi, Muslim governor
 Al-Zubayr ibn Bakkar, Muslim historian (b. 788)
 Caesar of Naples ("the Brave"), Italian admiral
 Gregory III, co-regent and duke of Naples
 He Quanhao, general of the Tang Dynasty (b. 839)
 Neot, English monk and saint (approximate date)
 Rastislav, ruler (knyaz) of Great Moravia
 Ratramnus, Frankish monk and abbot (approximate date)
 Wen Tingyun, Chinese poet and lyricist (b. 812)

References